The National Arts Centre (NAC) is a performing arts organisation in Ottawa, Ontario, along the Rideau Canal. It is based in the eponymous National Arts Centre building.

History
The NAC was one of a number of projects launched by the government of Lester B. Pearson to commemorate Canada's 1967 centenary. It opened its doors to the public for the first time on 31 May 1969, at a cost of C$46 million. 

In February 2014, the centre unveiled a new logo and slogan, Canada is our stage, in preparation for its fiftieth anniversary in 2019. The former logo had been designed by Ernst Roch and was in use since the centre's opening.

In October 2015, initial talks about plans to develop an Indigenous theatre were held between NAC leadership, Indigenous performers and community leaders from across Canada with the aim of making Indigenous theatre a core activity of the National Arts Centre. In June 2017, Kevin Loring was hired to be the first artistic director of the NAC Indigenous Theatre department, and Lori Marchard was appointed the first managing director of the department soon after. Along with Lindsay Lachance, an artistic associate as well, the Indigenous Theatre department works to increase the representation of Indigenous peoples through theatre and providing further space and resources for Indigenous actors and playwrights to thrive. To date, over $1 million was raised for the establishment of the Indigenous theatre department through a tribute dinner hosted by the NAC in June 2018. The first full season by the Indigenous theatre department commenced in fall 2019.

Departments

Orchestra 
The NAC Orchestra is a world class ensemble of outstanding classical musicians from across Canada and around the world, under the inspiring leadership of Music Director Alexander Shelley. Since its debut in 1969 at the opening of Canada’s National Arts Centre, the Orchestra has been praised for the passion and clarity of its performances, its groundbreaking educational programs, and its leadership in nurturing Canadian creativity.

Indigenous Theatre 
Kevin Loring is the current director of the Indigenous Theatre. Loring is Nlaka’pamux from Lytton BC a small town in the Fraser Canyon and was born November 24, 1974 (43). His first published play “Where The Blood Mixes” won the Governor General's Award for English- Language Drama in 2009. He is also the Artistic Director of The Savage Society. When asked what Indigenous theatre is he says that it is “Our stories told and performed through the lens of Indigenous people".

The Indigenous Theatre's first production, co-presented by the NAC English Theatre, was in September 2019 when Muriel Miguel directed Marie Clements' The Unnatural and Accidental Women. The production starred PJ Prudat as Rebecca and Monique Mojica as Aunt Shadie and also featured Yolanda Bonnell, Columpa C. Bobb, and Cheri Maracle.

Notable figures in the Indigenous theatre department include:

 Kevin Loring: playwright, actor and teacher, winner of the Governor General’s Award for English Language Drama for his play, Where the Blood Mixes in 2009
 Lori Marchand: former director of Western Canada Theatre and daughter of Len Marchand Sr., the first Indigenous Member of Parliament in Canada
 Lindsay Lachance: PhD candidate and sessional lecturer in theatre at the University of British Columbia and Simon Fraser University

Artistic aims and performances 
One of the largest performing arts facilities in Canada, the National Arts Centre displays ballets, orchestras, theatre and musical performances. At 1,158,000 sq ft (107,600 m2), the NAC works with thousands of artists, both emerging and established, from across Canada and around the world, and collaborates with dozens of other arts organizations across the country. The NAC operates in the performing arts fields of classical music, English theatre, French theatre, Indigenous theatre, dance, variety, and community programming. The NAC supports programs for young and emerging artists and programs for young audiences, and producing resources and study materials for teachers. The NAC is the only multidisciplinary, multilingual, performing arts centre in North America, and one of the largest in the world.

The National Arts Centre is home to the National Arts Centre Orchestra, considered one of the world's leading classical-size orchestras. Alexander Shelley, a conductor, pianist, cellist and teacher, has been the orchestra's music director since 2015. The artistic director of English Theatre is Nina Lee Aquino; the artistic director of French Theatre is Brigitte Haentjens; Cathy Levy is the executive producer of dance; Heather Moore is producer and executive director of the Scene Festivals; Heather Gibson is producer of NAC Presents. The National Arts Centre produces nine podcasts in both official languages. They cover French and English Theatre, Classical and Contemporary Canadian music. The NAC has since created an Indigenous Theatre discipline. On June 15, 2017, Kevin Loring was announced as the first Artistic Director of Indigenous Theatre.

Kurt Waldele was executive chef for two decades, up to his death in 2009. His successor Michael Blackie, was responsible for creating "Celebrity Chefs of Canada" which ran in both 2011 and 2012. In late 2012 Michael left the NAC to develop his own business in Ottawa located in the west end called NeXT. In 2013, John Morris was promoted to the position executive chef. John Morris worked under chefs David Garcelon, Michael Blackie and Steven Gugelmeier. Kenton Leier was appointed as Executive Chef, effective July 26, 2017.

The National Arts Centre is co-producer of the Canada Dance Festival and co-founder of the Magnetic North Theatre Festival, which it operates in partnership with the Canadian Theatre Festival Society. The Magnetic North Theatre Festival is an annual event first held in Ottawa in 2003, where it is held every second year, being held in other Canadian cities in the alternating years. The festival offers not only productions and performances for the theatre-going public, but offers workshops and seminars aimed at theatre students and professionals.

In 2021, during the COVID-19 pandemic in Canada the NAC created the series Undisrupted for CBC Gem, which featured four Canadian performers or composers of classical or opera music creating a short film set to a new original composition.

References

Further reading

External links

Ottawa Chamber Music Society
Construction of the NAC (YouTube)
National Arts Centre Corporation fonds (R854) at Library and Archives Canada
Sarah Jennings fonds (R14484) at Library and Archives Canada. The fonds documents essentially the history of the National Arts Centre. Records are the primary sources for Jennings's book Art and Politics: The History of the National Arts Centre.

Federal departments and agencies of Canada
Theatre in Ottawa
Canadian Centennial
Theatre companies in Ontario